Salvia verticillata, the lilac sage or whorled clary, is a herbaceous perennial native to a wide area ranging from central Europe to western Asia, and naturalized in northern Europe and North America. It was first described by Carl Linnaeus in 1753.

Salvia verticillata has a leafy base of mid-green leaves covered with hairs, putting up leaf-covered stems that carry  inflorescences. The tiny lavender flowers grow tightly packed in whorls, with tiny lime-green and purple calyces. The specific epithet verticillata refers to the whorls that grow in verticils.

References

verticillata
Plants described in 1753
Taxa named by Carl Linnaeus
Flora of Europe
Flora of Asia